The 2016 Cavan Intermediate Football Championship was the 52nd edition of Cavan GAA's premier Gaelic football tournament for intermediate graded clubs in County Cavan, Ireland. The tournament consists of 14 teams, with the winner representing Cavan in the Ulster Intermediate Club Football Championship.

The championship starts with a league stage and then progresses to a knock out stage. The draw for the group stages was made on 12 April 2016.

Arva and Killinkere reached the final, and the game ended in a draw. Arva won the replay by a point to win their first Intermediate title for 33 years.

Team Changes
The following teams have changed division since the 2015 championship season.

To Championship
Promoted from 2015 Cavan Junior Football Championship
  Templeport  -  (Junior Champions)
Relegated from 2015 Cavan Senior Football Championship
  Drumalee
  Drumgoon

From Championship
Promoted to 2016 Cavan Senior Football Championship
  Ballyhaise  -  (Intermediate Champions)

League Stage
All 14 teams enter the competition at this stage. A random draw determines which teams face each other in each of the four rounds. No team can meet each other twice in the group stage. The top 8 teams go into a seeded draw for the quarter-finals while the bottom 6 teams will enter a Relegation Playoff.

Round 1

Round 2

Round 3

Round 4

League play-offs

Quarter-final/Relegation play-off

Knock-Out Stage

Quarter-finals

Semi-finals

Final

Relegation play-offs
The teams placed 8–14 in the league phase will play off against each other. The 3 winners will maintain their intermediate status for 2017, while the three losers will be relegated to the 2017 J.F.C.

References

External links
 Official Cavan GAA Website

Cavan Intermediate
Cavan GAA Football championships